The 2008 SAFF Championship was held in Malé, Maldives and Colombo, Sri Lanka between 3 and 14 June 2008. 

Initially, the tournament was due to be held in 2007 but was postponed to 2008.

Venues

Squads

Group stage

Group A

Group B

Knockout phase

Bracket

Semi-finals

Final

Champion

Statistics

Goalscorers

4 goals
  H. A. Habib
3 goals
  Ibrahim Fazeel
  Chathura Gunarathna
2 goals

  Ju Manu Rai
  Yeshey Gyeltshen
  Ismail Mohamed
  Pappachen Pradeep
  Sunil Chhetri
  Gouramangi Singh

1 goal

  Ahmed Thoriq
  Nima Sangay
  Kinley Dorji
  Yeshey Dorji
  Mukhthar Naseer
  Mustafa Hadid
  Raju Tamang
  Nirajan Rayamajhi
  Vishad Gouchan
  Steven Dias
  Bhaichung Bhutia
  Sushil Kumar Singh
  Mohamed Shifan
  Arup Kumar Baidya
  Jahid Hasan Ameli
  Mamunul Islam Mamun
  Adnan Farooq Ahmed
  Samar Ishaq
  Channa Ediri Bandanage

1 own goal

  Naveed Akram

Other statistics
Most goals scored by: Maldives and India (9 goals)
Fewest goals scored by: Pakistan (2 goals)
Most goals conceded by: Nepal and Pakistan (9 goals)
Fewest goals conceded by: Maldives (2 goals)
Fastest goal by: Raju Tamang for Nepal against Pakistan

Notes and references

External links
Watch Live Streaming of All Asian Football
Official Website of SAFF Cup 2008
Independent report of the tournament's early games

2008
2008
2008
2007–08 in Sri Lankan football
2008 in Maldivian football
2008 in Asian football
2007–08 in Pakistani football
2008 in Nepalese sport
2008 in Bhutanese football
2008 in Bangladeshi football
2008 in Afghan football
2007–08 in Indian football